The discography of American rock band P.O.D. consists of 11 studio albums, 3 live albums, 1 compilation album, 2 video albums, 3 extended plays, 22 singles, 3 promotional singles and 26 music videos.

Albums

Studio albums

Live albums

Compilation albums

Video albums

Extended plays

Singles

Promotional singles

Other appearances

Music videos

Notes

References

External links
 
 
 

Heavy metal group discographies
Discographies of American artists
Christian music discographies